The Khadga dynasty was a dynasty which ruled the areas of Vanga and Samatata in Bengal from the mid 7th to early 8th Century CE. Chronologically, the dynasty emerged as a powerful kingdom between the fall of Gauda Kingdom and the rise of the Pala Empire. Their ascendancy may have been immediately preceded by the overthrow of a previously ruling Bhadra dynasty. While they did not assume imperial titles, the Khadgas retained sovereignty over the ancient kingdom of Vanga and later conquered Samatata.

List of rulers

References

Medieval Bengal
Dynasties of Bengal
Buddhist dynasties of India